Olustvere Parish was a rural municipality of Estonia, in Viljandi County. The parish existed until 1950. The parish re-established in 1991. The parish was liquidated in 2005.

References

Viljandi County
Former municipalities of Estonia